The Nandi Award for Best Cinematographer winners was commissioned since 1977:

References

Cinematography
Awards for best cinematography